Sigurd Iversen (13 March 1926 – 27 June 2004) was a Danish footballer. He played in three matches for the Denmark national football team in 1947.

References

External links
 

1926 births
2004 deaths
Danish men's footballers
Denmark international footballers
Place of birth missing
Association footballers not categorized by position